Erik Blegvad (3 March 1923 – 14 January 2014) was a British illustrator of more than a hundred books, including The Winter Bear, The Borrowers, and the 1957 omnibus Bedknob and Broomstick. He died at the age of 90.

References

External links 

 
 

1923 births
2014 deaths
British illustrators
Danish emigrants to the United Kingdom